True Crime News Weekly is an Australian subscriber news website published by PR 4 THE PPL PTY LTD.
It aims to cover breaking crime news, politics, media, opinion, culture reviews, and historical true crime. 
It has been cited in Australia for its exclusives and investigations into political scandals, and has been noted for first breaking the notorious 'Barnaby Joyce Scandal' that resulted in Australian Deputy PM Barnaby Joyce being forced to resign as National Party of Australia leader in early 2018.

History
True Crime News Weekly was launched in January 2017 by investigative journalist Serkan Ozturk, who remains its publisher. Gary Johnston is the publication's deputy editor. Originally launched as a free blog, the website became a subscriber news site in October 2018. As noted on the site, the site claims to be "inspired by the pulp fiction and noir of yesteryear" and regards itself to be progressive.

Staff & Contributors

Contributors to True Crime News Weekly include investigative journalist Serkan Ozturk, academic and writer Gary Johnston, novelist Miles Hunt, activist and satirist Tom Tanuki, comedian Kieran Butler, author and essayist Irfan Yusuf, and academic Therese Taylor.

Notable Coverage
The Daily Telegraph was awarded a Walkley Award in 2018 for Scoop of the Year for their coverage of the 'Barnaby Joyce Scandal', however True Crime News Weekly had first published stories about the scandal in October 2017, almost six months before the Daily Telegraph's articles.
In April 2019, True Crime News Weekly claims to have been the first publication to reveal that controversial Nationals MP George Christensen had been visiting sex bars in seedy parts of the Philippines, almost eight months before the rest of the Australian media.
In February 2020, True Crime News Weekly claimed to have been the first media outlet to publicly name former Liberal Party adviser Bruce Lehrmann as the alleged rapist at the centre of the 2021 Australian Parliament House sexual misconduct allegations. Lehrmann was charged over the alleged rape six months later.

Criticism 
There has been a challenge to Ozturk's claims about him breaking the story about Barnaby Joyce along with a general challenge to the rigour of his journalism, however Ozturk claimed his original coverage in October 2017 had details ignored by Ms Meade in her article. Ozturk has also received both criticism and support on his Twitter account

References

External links 

Australian news websites